Elections to Manchester Council were held on Thursday, 7 May 1998. One third of the council was up for election, with each successful candidate to serve a four-year term of office, expiring in 2002. A vacancy each in Ardwick and Harpurhey were also being contested. There were two Labour candidates for Barlow Moor ward, the result of de-selected Labour Councillor Arthur Maloney securing an official Labour Party nomination before he was replaced by a new candidate. The Independent Labour candidates stood as Labour Peace 2000. Overall turnout was 20.5%, with Labour retaining control of the council.

Election result

After the election, the composition of the council was as follows:

Ward results

Ardwick

Baguley

Barlow Moor

Benchill

Beswick and Clayton

Blackley

Bradford

Brooklands

Burnage

Central

Charlestown

Cheetham

Chorlton

Crumpsall

Didsbury

Fallowfield

Gorton North

Gorton South

Harpurhey

Hulme

Levenshulme

Lightbowne

Longsight

Moss Side

Moston

Newton Heath

Northenden

Old Moat

Rusholme

Sharston

Whalley Range

Withington

Woodhouse Park

By-elections between 1998 and 1999

References

1998 English local elections
1998
1990s in Manchester